Deh Now is a village in Doab Rural District, in the Central District of Selseleh County, Lorestan Province, Iran. At the 2006 census, its population was 199, in 36 families.

References 

Towns and villages in Selseleh County